Gwoyeu Romatzyh, abbreviated GR, is a system for writing Mandarin Chinese in the Latin alphabet. The system was conceived by Yuen Ren Chao and developed by a group of linguists including Chao and Lin Yutang from 1925 to 1926. Chao himself later published influential works in linguistics using GR. In addition a small number of other textbooks and dictionaries in GR were published in Hong Kong and overseas from 1942 to 2000.

GR is the better known of the two romanization systems which indicate the four tones of Mandarin by varying the spelling of syllables ("tonal spelling"). These tones are fundamental to the Chinese language; their presence lets speakers discriminate between otherwise identical syllables and words. Other systems indicate the tones with either diacritics (for example Pinyin: āi, ái, ǎi and ài) or numbers (Wade–Giles: ai1, ai2, etc.). GR spells the four tones of the same vowel, ai, air, ae and ay. These spellings, which follow specific rules, indicate the tones while retaining the pronunciation of the syllable ai.

Chao claimed that, because GR embeds the tone of each syllable in its spelling, it may help students to master Chinese tones. One study of GR, however, comparing students' ability to dictate a romanized text in GR versus pinyin, found that the use of GR resulted in slightly lower accuracy in tonal production. GR uses a complicated system of tonal spelling that obscures the basic relationship between spelling and tone; for example, the difference between tones 1 and 2 is variously indicated as mha vs. ma, ching vs. chyng, chang vs. charng, etc.  Although tonal spelling has been adopted as part of the normal romanization of a number of Asian languages (e.g. Hmong and Zhuang), all such systems indicate different tones in a simple and consistent fashion by adding letters to the end of a syllable (e.g. in Hmong, -b indicates high tone, -s indicates low tone, -j indicates high-falling tone, etc.).

In September 1928, China adopted GR as the nation's official romanization system. GR was used to indicate pronunciations in dictionaries of the National (Mandarin-based) Language. Its proponents hoped one day to establish it as a writing system for a reformed Chinese script. But despite support from a small number of trained linguists in China and overseas, GR met with public indifference and even hostility due to its complexity. Another obstacle preventing its widespread adoption was its narrow basis on the Beijing dialect, in a period lacking a strong centralized government to enforce its use. Eventually GR lost ground to Pinyin and other later romanization systems. However, its influence is still evident, as several of the principles introduced by its creators have been used in romanization systems that followed it. Its pattern of tone spelling was retained in the standard spelling of the Chinese province of Shaanxi (shǎnxī, 陕西), which cannot be distinguished from Shanxi (shānxī, 山西) when written in pinyin without diacritics.

History

Tonal spelling, Gwoyeu Romatzyh's most distinctive feature, was first suggested to Y.R. Chao by Lin Yutang. By 1922 Chao had already established the main principles of GR.
The details of the system were developed in 1925–1926 by a group of five linguists, led by Chao and including Lin, under the auspices of the Preparatory Commission for the Unification of the National Language. On September 26, 1928, GR was officially adopted by the Kuomintang Nationalist government. GR was intended to be used alongside the existing Juhin (Zhùyīn) phonetic symbols: hence the alternative name for GR, "Second Pattern of the National Alphabet". Both systems were used to indicate the revised standard of pronunciation in the new official Vocabulary of National Pronunciation for Everyday Use of 1932. The designers of GR had greater ambitions: their aim was complete reform of the script, using GR as a practical system of writing.

In the 1930s two short-lived attempts were made to teach GR to railway workers and peasants in Hénán and Shāndōng provinces. Support for GR, being confined to a small number of trained linguists and Sinologists, "was distinguished more for its quality than its quantity." The supporters included Qian Xuantong and Luo Changpei in China and Walter Simon in England. During this period GR faced increasing hostility because of the complexity of its tonal spelling. Conversely, Sinologist Bernhard Karlgren criticised GR for its lack of phonetic rigour. Ultimately, like the rival (toneless) system Latinxua Sinwenz, GR failed to gain widespread support, principally because the "National" language was too narrowly based on Beijing speech: "a sufficiently precise and strong language norm had not yet become a reality in China".

A vestigial use of GR can be seen in the official spelling of the first syllable of Shaanxi for Shǎnxī (陕西) province, to distinguish it from Shānxī (山西) province, particularly in foreign-language text where the tone marks are often omitted. Some prominent Chinese have used GR to transliterate their names: for example the mathematician Shiing-Shen Chern. The romanization system was changed by the government of the People's Republic of China in 1958 to the current system used now in the country, and other foreign and international institutions, like the United Nations, the Library of Congress, the International Organization for Standardization, and is widely used to teach Mandarin Chinese to foreign students: Hanyu Pinyin. Meanwhile, in the Republic of China (Taiwan), GR survived until the 1970s as a pronunciation aid in monolingual dictionaries such as Gwoyeu Tsyrdean [Guóyǔ Cídiǎn] and Tsyrhuey [Cíhuì], but was officially replaced in 1986 by a modified form known as Mandarin Phonetic Symbols II. The Warring States period State of Wey is often spelled as such to distinguish it from the more prominent state , which are both pronounced Wèi in Mandarin, but in Old Chinese it was probably /*ɢʷat-s/ and /*N-qʰuj-s/, respectively.

Description

Note: In this section the word "tone" is abbreviated as "T": thus T1 stands for Tone 1 (first tone), etc. To assist readers unfamiliar with GR, Pinyin equivalents have been added in brackets.

Basic forms (Tone 1)

An important feature of GR, adopted from other precursors and later also adopted by Pinyin, is the use of contrasting unvoiced/voiced pairs of consonants from Latin to represent aspirated and unaspirated sounds in Chinese. Another distinctive feature of GR is the use of j, ch, and sh to represent two different series of sounds. When followed by i these letters correspond to the alveolo-palatal sounds (Pinyin j, q, and x); otherwise they correspond to the retroflex sounds (Pinyin zh, ch, and sh). Readers used to Pinyin need to pay particular attention to these spellings: for example, GR ju, jiu, and jiou correspond to Pinyin zhu, ju, and jiu respectively.

GR orthography has these additional notable features:

iu represents the close front rounded vowel  spelled ü or in many cases simply u in Pinyin.
Final -y represents the  allophone of i: GR shy and sy correspond to Pinyin shi and si respectively.
el corresponds to Pinyin er (-r being reserved to indicate Tone2). The most important use of -(e)l is as a rhotacization suffix, as in ideal = i dean + -(e)l, "a little" (yìdiǎnr).
A number of frequently occurring morphemes have abbreviated spellings in GR. The commonest of these are: -g (-ge), -j (-zhe), -m (-me), sh (shi) and -tz (-zi).

Tonal modifications
By default, the basic GR spelling described above is used for Tone1 syllables. The basic form is then modified to indicate tones 2, 3 and 4. This is accomplished in one of three ways:

either a vowel is changed to another vowel resembling it in sound (i to y, for example, or u to w)
or a letter is doubled
or a silent letter (r or h) is added after the vowel.

Wherever possible the concise first method is used. The following rules of thumb cover most cases.

Tone 1 (basic form)

shiue, chuan, chang, hai, bau (xuē, chuān, chāng, hāi, bāo)

Tone 2: i/u → y/w; or add -r
shyue, chwan, charng, hair, baur (xué, chuán, cháng, hái, báo)

Tone 3: i/u → e/o; or double vowel

sheue, choan, chaang, hae, bao (xuě, chuǎn, chǎng, hǎi, bǎo)

Tone 4: change/double final letter; or add -h

shiueh, chuann, chanq, hay, baw (xuè, chuàn, chàng, hài, bào)

Neutral tone: precede with a dot (full stop)

perng.yeou, dih.fang (péngyou, dìfang).

Exception Syllables with an initial sonorant (l-/m-/n-/r-) use the basic form for T2 rather than T1. In these syllables the (rarer) T1 is marked with -h- as the second letter. For example, mha is T1 (mā), whereas ma is T2 (má). T3 and T4 are regular: maa (mǎ) and mah (mà).

Compounds as words
An important principle of GR is that syllables which form words should be written together. This strikes speakers of European languages as obvious; but in Chinese the concept of "word" is not easy to pin down. The basic unit of speech is popularly thought to be the monosyllable represented by a character ( tzyh, zì), which in most cases represents a meaningful syllable or morpheme, a smaller unit than the "linguistic word". Characters are written and printed with no spaces between words; yet in practice most Chinese words consist of two-syllable compounds, and it was Chao's bold innovation in 1922 to reflect this in GR orthography by grouping the appropriate syllables together into words. This represented a radical departure from hyphenated Wade–Giles forms such as Kuo2-yü3 Lo2-ma3-tzu4 (the Wade spelling of GR).

Use in published texts
Chao used GR in four influential works:
Concise Dictionary of Spoken Chinese (in collaboration with Lien Sheng Yang) (1947)
Mandarin Primer (1948)
A Grammar of Spoken Chinese (1968a)
 (1968b) ("Sayable" in this context means colloquial, as opposed to the vernacular Chinese (bairhuah, Pinyin báihuà) style often read by students.)

Mandarin Primer was originally used in the Army Specialized Training Program at the Harvard School for Overseas Administration in 1943–1944 and subsequently in civilian courses.

Readings in Sayable Chinese was written "to supply the advanced student of spoken Chinese with reading matter which he can actually use in his speech."} It consists of three volumes of Chinese text with facing GR romanization. They contain some lively recorded dialogues, "Fragments of an autobiography", two plays and a translation of Lewis Carroll's Through the Looking-Glass (Tzoou daw Jinqtz lii). Two extracts from Tzoou daw Jinqtz lii with facing translations can be read online.

In 1942 Walter Simon introduced GR to English-speaking sinologists in a special pamphlet, The New Official Chinese Latin Script. Over the remainder of the 1940s he published a series of textbooks and readers, as well as a Chinese-English Dictionary, all using GR. His son Harry Simon later went on to use GR in scholarly papers on Chinese linguistics.

In 1960 Y.C. Liu, a colleague of Walter Simon's at SOAS, published Fifty Chinese Stories. These selections from classical texts were presented in both classical and modern Chinese, together with GR romanizations and romanized Japanese versions prepared by Simon (by that time Professor Emeritus of Chinese in the University of London).

Lin Yutang's Chinese-English Dictionary of Modern Usage (1972) incorporated a number of innovative features, one of which was a simplified version of GR. Lin eliminated most of the spelling rules requiring substitution of vowels, as can be seen from his spelling Guoryuu Romatzyh, in which the regular -r is used for T2 and a doubled vowel for T3.

The first 3 issues of the Shin Tarng magazine (which would be Xīn Táng in Pinyin; published in 1982–1989) used a Simplified Romanisation based on Gwoyeu Romatzyh; the fourth edition, entitled Xin Talng, used Pinyin with Gwoyeu Romatzyh-like tone marking.

Language learning
Chao believed that the benefit of GR was to make tonal differences more salient to learners:

For example, it may be easier to memorize the difference between GR Beeijing (the city) and beyjiing ("background") than the Pinyin versions Běijīng and bèijǐng, where the tones seem to be almost an afterthought. One study conducted at the University of Oregon in 1991–1993, compared the results of using Pinyin and GR in teaching elementary level Chinese to two matched groups of students, and concluded that "GR did not lead to significantly greater accuracy in tonal production."

GR continues to be used by some teachers of Chinese. In 2000, the Princeton Chinese Primer series was published in both GR and Pinyin versions.

Example
Here is an extract from Y.R. Chao's Sayable Chinese. The topic is scholarly ("What is Sinology?"), but the style colloquial. The tonal spelling markers or "clues" are again highlighted using the same color-coding scheme as above. Versions in Chinese characters, Pinyin and English are given below the GR text.

See also
Spelling in Gwoyeu Romatzyh

Notes

References

 Chapter 4 is available online.

External links

 Chinese Phonetic Conversion Tool - Converts between Gwoyeu Romatzyh and other formats

Chinese dictionaries
Romanization of Chinese